Die Flucht aus der Hölle is an East German film. It was released in 1960.

External links
 

1960 films
1960s thriller films
German thriller films
East German films
1960s German-language films
Algerian War films
Political thriller films
French Foreign Legion in popular culture
Films about the French Foreign Legion
1960s German films